Valentin Păduroiu (born 18 October 1961) is a Romanian politician, former deputy between 2000 and 2004. He is currently the acting president of the Alliance for the Homeland.

Biography
Păduroiu was born in 1961 and graduated from the Mircea cel Bătrân Naval Academy. He worked as an electromechanical engineer and as a naval officer.

He was a member of the Chamber of the Deputies between 2000 and 2004, being a Member of the Greater Romania Party. In 2001 he joined the Social Democratic Party. A close acquaintance of Codrin Ștefănescu and Liviu Dragnea, he was one of the founding members of the Alliance for the Homeland. He is currently acting president of the party.

References

1961 births
21st-century Romanian politicians
Leaders of political parties in Romania
Social Democratic Party (Romania) politicians
Living people
Greater Romania Party politicians
Romanian electrical engineers
Romanian Naval Forces officers
Members of the Chamber of Deputies (Romania)